The 14th Actors and Actresses Union Awards ceremony was held on 20 June 2005 at Madrid's Palacio de Congresos y Exposiciones. The gala was hosted by Concha Velasco and the comedy duo 'Quésquíspás'.

Winners and nominees 
The winners and nominees are listed as follows:

Film

Television

Theatre

Newcomers

References 

Actors and Actresses Union Awards
2005 in Madrid
2005 television awards
2005 film awards
2005 theatre awards
June 2005 events in Europe